The Arkansas Traveler is an honorary title bestowed on notable individuals who, through their actions serve as goodwill ambassadors for the US state of Arkansas. A certificate is signed by the governor, secretary of state and the recipient's sponsor, and given to the honoree during a ceremony attended by the signers.

Background

The Arkansas Traveler story is connected to Colonel Sandford C. Faulkner, who was very active in Arkansas politics. He was also involved in banking and farming during the 19th century. As oral history has relayed it, Faulkner had gotten lost in the Ozarks during one of his many political campaigns. Looking for a place to stay overnight, Faulkner wandered by a small, log cabin where he was given lodging and hospitality. Faulkner, who was known for retelling of the event, explained that the settler was at first bad tempered and uncommunicative but became more welcoming when Faulkner proved able to complete playing the tune that the settler had been playing on the fiddle. Generally when Faulkner told the story, only he and the settler participated in the conversation. Faulkner's story of the "Arkansas Traveler" rapidly became part of the state's folklore, leading to the creation of a famous painting by Edward Payson Washbourne which depicts the event. Later, in 1870, Currier and Ives created a lithograph of the famous painting. Faulkner was also known to perform the tune often on the fiddle. Faulkner would play the fiddle as part of his narrative.

History
The award was approved in a resolution by the Arkansas Legislature. The award was created in early 1941 with the first certificate granted May 20, 1941, to President of the United States, Franklin Delano Roosevelt. Before becoming President, Bill Clinton conferred the Arkansas Traveller title upon numerous individuals as well.

Notable recipients

References

1941 introductions
Arkansas culture
Culture of the Southern United States
Government of Arkansas
Honorary titles of the United States
State awards and decorations of the United States